Al Ross may refer to:

Al Ross (cartoonist); see Arlen Roth
Al Ross (businessman), owner of Doggie Diner

See also
Albert Ross (disambiguation)
Alfred Ross (disambiguation)